Delía Beatriz Capotosto (16 May 1962 – 20 December 2018) was an Argentine athlete who specialised in the sprint hurdles. She represented her country at the 1983 World Championships and 1984 Summer Olympics. In addition, she won multiple medals at the regional level. She was born and died in Buenos Aires.

International competitions

Personal bests
Outdoor
100 metres hurdles – 13.45 (Santiago, Chile 1984)
400 metres hurdles – 59.86 (Buenos Aires 1984)
Indoor
60 metres hurdles – 8.47 (Paris 1985)

References

1962 births
2018 deaths
Argentine female hurdlers
Athletes (track and field) at the 1979 Pan American Games
Athletes (track and field) at the 1983 Pan American Games
Athletes (track and field) at the 1987 Pan American Games
Athletes (track and field) at the 1984 Summer Olympics
Olympic athletes of Argentina
Athletes from Buenos Aires
South American Games gold medalists for Argentina
South American Games medalists in athletics
Competitors at the 1982 Southern Cross Games
Pan American Games competitors for Argentina
World Athletics Championships athletes for Argentina